Alfred John Markiewicz (May 17, 1928 – January 9, 1997) was an American prelate of the Catholic Church who served as bishop of the Diocese of Kalamazoo in Michigan, from 1994 to 1997.  He previously served as an auxiliary bishop of the Diocese of Rockville Centre in New York from 1986 to 1995.

Biography
Alfred Markiewicz was born on May 17, 1928, in Brooklyn, New York.  He was ordained to the priesthood in Rome by Archbishop Thomas Edmund Molloy on June 6, 1953, for the Diocese of Brooklyn. Markiewicz was incardinated, or transferred, to the Diocese of Rockville Centre on April 6, 1957.

Pope John Paul II appointed Markiewicz as an auxiliary bishop of the Diocese of Rockville Centre on July 1, 1986; he was consecrated by Bishop John Raymond McGann on September 17, 1986.

On November 22, 1994, John Paul II appointed Markiewicz as bishop of the Diocese of Kalamazoo.  He was installed on January 31, 1995.

In September 1996, Markiewicz travelled to Rockville Centre, New York, for radiation treatment of two brain tumors.  Alfred Markiewicz died in Huntington, New York, on January 8, 1997 while in office.

Notes

People from Brooklyn
20th-century Roman Catholic bishops in the United States
1928 births
1997 deaths
American people of Polish descent
Roman Catholic bishops of Kalamazoo
Catholics from New York (state)